Iona College is a small affiliated college of the University of Windsor located in Windsor, Ontario, Canada. Initially founded by the United Church of Canada, in 2016 the college announced it would become an interfaith college with a board of directors representing a variety of religious groups.

History
In December 1963, prior to its formation, Iona was included alongside Canterbury College and Assumption University in an affiliation agreement with the University of Windsor. Iona College was officially opened in 1964 by the United Church of Canada.  It was named after the island of Iona in Scotland.

Original building
The college's original campus consisted of a single house located at 208 Sunset Avenue on the campus of the University of Windsor. The building was formerly the home of Bruce J. S. MacDonald, who prosecuted war crimes charges against SS general Kurt Meyer as part of the Canadian War Crimes Commission and later served as a Crown attorney and judge in Windsor. The college sold 208 Sunset Avenue to the University of Windsor in July 2016 due to Iona College's rising debt and the poor condition of the building. The university was permitted to begin demolition after significant community debate over whether the house should be designated a heritage building. 208 Sunset Avenue was demolished in May 2018 with the university announcing that the land would be developed into a public park.

Programs
The College has two schools: The School of Languages, which provides English as a Section Language instruction and the School of Theology.  The College offers a Bachelor of Theology degree in conjunction with Huntington University and the Ecumenical Theological Seminary in nearby Detroit, Michigan as well as Certificates related to ministers.  The School of Theology is, as of 2011, no longer accepting new applicants.

References

External links
 
 history of the College

University of Windsor
1964 establishments in Ontario
Educational institutions established in 1964
United Church of Canada